The 2005 UK & Ireland Greyhound Racing Year was the 80th year of greyhound racing in the United Kingdom and Ireland.

Summary
Westmead Hawk captured the public's imagination with his 'late charge' style of running and won the 2005 English Greyhound Derby.  The Nick Savva trained greyhound was later voted as the Greyhound of the Year and Mark Wallis secured the Greyhound Trainer of the Year at the end of his maiden year as a trainer.

The 2005 Irish Greyhound Derby was considered to be one of the best in modern times with 'He Said So' winning the final that included Westmead Hawk, Droopys Marco and Irish Dog of the Year Droopys Maldini.

Tracks
Gaming International/BS Group closed  Milton Keynes Greyhound Stadium on Boxing Day despite earlier assurances that it would be rebuilt.  The company had closed Bristol in 1997 in similar circumstances.

Competitions
Charlie Lister stopped Brian Clemenson from winning a fourth consecutive Trainers Championship. Robbie De Niro and Ballymac Kewell made the Scottish Greyhound Derby final unbeaten before the latter was withdrawn leaving Robbie De Niro hot favourite but the final saw dual Irish Greyhound Derby finalist Droopys Marco trained by Frazer Black win the £25,000 first prize.

News
Mick Wheble former Group Racing Manager for Northern Sports was awarded an MBE for services to greyhound racing and charity during the Queen's 2005 Birthday Honours. 

Ernie Gaskin retired, with the kennels being taken over by his son Ernest Gaskin Jr. who retained the contract at Walthamstow Stadium, as did Mark Wallis who took over the Linda Jones Imperial Kennels. Linda was a two times champion trainer and had amassed 13 Category One successes before deciding to retire due to ill health.

Roll of honour

Principal UK finals

Principal Irish finals

References 

Greyhound racing in the United Kingdom
Greyhound racing in the Republic of Ireland
2005 in British sport
2005 in Irish sport